Hasanabad-e Etemad (also Romanized as Ḩasanābād-e E‘temād; also known as Ḩasanābād) is a village in Dastgerdan Rural District, Dastgerdan District, Tabas County, South Khorasan Province, Iran. At the 2006 census, its population was 61, in 13 families.

References 

Populated places in Tabas County